The Commonwealth Games Federation (CGF) uses three-letter abbreviation country codes to refer to each group of athletes that participate in the Commonwealth Games. Each code identifies a Commonwealth Games Association.

Several of the CGF codes are different from the standard ISO 3166-1 alpha-3 codes. Other sporting organisations, such as the International Olympic Committee or FIFA, use similar country codes to refer to their respective teams.

Current CGAs
There are 120 current CGAs that participate at the Commonwealth Games. The following tables show the currently used code for each CGA and any different codes used in past Games. Some of the past code usage is further explained in the following sections.

A

B

C

D

E

F

G

I

J

K

L

M

N

P

R

S

T

U

V

W

Z

Historic CGAs and teams

Codes still in use

Obsolete codes

Notes

See also
 List of IOC country codes
 List of FIFA country codes

References

CGF list
CGF Country Codes